The Little Fruitseller is a c.1670-1675 oil on canvas painting by Bartolomé Esteban Murillo, held in the Alte Pinakothek in Munich, to which it was bequeathed in 1768 by Franz Joseph von Dufresne, a Hofkammerrate.

References

Paintings by Bartolomé Esteban Murillo
1670s paintings
Collection of the Alte Pinakothek
Genre paintings